Stoica is a common surname in Romania. Persons named Stoica include:
Alin Stoica, footballer
Andrei Stoica, kickboxer
Bogdan Stoica, kickboxer
Chivu Stoica, communist politician, former Prime Minister of Romania
Constantin T. Stoika, poet
Cristian Stoica, rugby union footballer
Dorel Stoica, footballer
Ion Stoica, computer scientist
Laura Stoica, pop singer
Mihai Stoica, soccer manager
Peter Stoica, researcher and educator
Petre Stoica, poet
Pompiliu Stoica, footballer
Ștefan Stoica, footballer and manager
Ștefan Stoica, politician
Tudorel Stoica, footballer
Valeriu Stoica, politician
Vasile Stoica, diplomat and politician

Romanian-language surnames